Air Traffic Services Message Handling Services (AMHS) is a standard for aeronautical ground-ground communications (e.g. for the transmission of NOTAM, Flight Plans or Meteorological Data) based on X.400 profiles. It has been defined by the ICAO.

Levels of service

ICAO Doc 9880 Part II   defines two fundamental levels of service within the ATSMHS;
 Basic ATSMHS and
 the Extended ATSMHS.
Additionally, ICAO Doc 9880 (Part II, section 3.4) outlines different subsets of the Extended ATSMHS. The Basic ATSMHS performs an operational role similar to the
Aeronautical Fixed Telecommunication Network with a few enhancements. The Extended ATSMHS provided enhanced features but includes the Basic level of service
capability; in this way it is ensured that users with Extended Service capabilities can inter-operate, at a basic level, with users having Basic Service capabilities and vice versa.

The ATSMHS is provided by a set of end systems, which collectively comprise the ATS Message Handling System. The systems co-operate to provide users (human or automated) with a data communication service. The AMHS network is composed of interconnected ATS Message Servers that perform message switching at the application layer (Layer 7 in the OSI model).

Direct users connect to ATS Message Servers by means of ATS Message User Agents. An ATS Message User Agent supporting the Extended level of service will use
the Basic level of service to allow communication with users who only support the Basic ATSMHS.

Interoperability 

In order to ensure unobstructed communication between the ANSPs, the European Air Navigation Planning Group (EANPG) of ICAO has defined 59 test cases in its EUR AMHS Manual (V5.0), 17/06/2010 (Appendix D, AMHS Conformance Tests), ASIA/PAC AMHS Manual (Annex B, AMHS Conformance and Compatibility Test, V2.0, 22/09/08) which have to be performed prior to establishment of bilateral links between the ANSPs. Those tests are conducted using a test engine (AMHS Conformance Test Tool) and verify the conformance to the AMHS standard, which is defined in ICAO Doc 9880-AN/466: Manual on Detailed Technical Specifications for the Aeronautical Telecommunication Network (ATN) using ISO/OSI Standards and Protocols, Second Advanced Edition - 2016, Part II.

In the context of Single European Sky (SES) initiative and the European regulation EC552/2004 EUROCONTROL developed a specification  to complement the regulation. The use of the specifications facilitates the demonstration of conformity to the essential requirements and regulatory provisions.

Implementations 

In order to facilitate the transition from legacy protocols to this new standard EUROCONTROL launched a project called ECG (European or EATM Communications Gateway) to develop a gateway between AFTN and AMHS. The ECG was developed by the French manufacturer THALES and the German manufacturer FREQUENTIS COMSOFT. Meanwhile, nearly all AMHS systems in Europe are derived from the ECG (see table below).

Similar solutions are offered by Indra Avitech GmbH (Germany), Intelcan (Canada), TELEFONICA (Spain), IDS (Italy, Canada), Copperchase Ltd (UK),Radiocom (USA) working together with Skysoft Servicios S.A. (Argentina) and FREQUENTIS (Austria).

The first AMHS system was implemented by Avitech GmbH (Germany) as a pioneer solution and went into operational use in 1996 with 36 centers for the German Military (Bundeswehr) and the first AMHS connection in Europe is in operational use since February 2005 between the  ANSPs of Germany and Spain. Second in Europe were Bosnia and Herzegovina with Austria in 2011. The first operational AMHS connection in the Middle East was established in 2009 between the United Arab Emirates (Abu Dhabi) and Oman. In the meantime Abu Dhabi has evolved as a nucleus for the introduction of AMHS in the Middle East, resulting in a coherent AMHS network of operational connection between UAE, Jordan, Egypt, Saudi Arabia, Oman and Qatar. Since 2010 Jordan, Egypt and Saudi Arabia form the first operational AMHS triangle. In 2012 the South American countries Peru and Colombia joined the circle of AMHS users while Asia has operated AMHS links between Hong Kong and Macao since 2009 and between Singapore and India since 2011.

Interregional AMHS connections for improved traffic between ICAO regions could be established between the UK and the US in 2011 and the UK and Singapore in the beginning of 2012.

By end 2011, ANSPs worldwide have replaced 14 operational international AFTN connections by an AMHS link. The up-to-date worldwide implementation status of AMHS is recorded in the ICAO COM Charts which are available from the AMC (ATS Messaging Management Centre) operated by EUROCONTROL.

AMHS usage around the world

See also
 Aeronautical Fixed Service
 Aeronautical Fixed Telecommunication Network

References

External links 
 Eurocontrol Sub-Domain on ATS Message Handling System (AMHS)
 AMHS User Group
 AMHS Book
 AMHS naming
 Routing Policy for AMHS in Asia/Pacific region
 ICAO Aeronautical Communications Panel
 Alternative Solution to ECG
 AMHS Training
 AMHS Conformance Test Tool
 Hipaa Messaging

Aviation communications
Email